Upper Dublin Township is a township in Montgomery County, Pennsylvania, United States. The population was 25,569 at the 2010 census. Until the 1950s, Upper Dublin was mostly farmland and open space, but transitioned to a residential suburb during the postwar population boom. The population went from just over 6,000 residents in the 1950s to just under 20,000 by 1970. Today, Upper Dublin is mostly spread-out development housing, and has the fourth highest median income in Montgomery County.

Upper Dublin is made up of several community areas, many of which are unincorporated areas in Montgomery County with no legal status, and are used primarily by the US Postal Service.  These community areas are portions of Abington (19001), Ambler (19002) (excluding the Borough of Ambler), Ardsley (19038), Dresher (19025), Fort Washington (19034), Jarrettown (19025), Maple Glen (19002), North Hills (19038), Oreland (19075), and Willow Grove (19090).

History

Founding
Edward Tanner was granted land by William Penn in the Province of Pennsylvania and named it "Upper and Lower Dublin."  Lower Dublin was incorporated into the City of Philadelphia following the passage of the Act of Consolidation in 1854. The "upper" portion has continued to exist around the original survey for the laying out and naming of Susquehanna Road. Upper Dublin Township was established in 1701, when William Penn ordered a survey of all townships in the Commonwealth. It was first settled in 1698, and incorporated in 1719. The township was granted its current status of First Class Township in the Commonwealth of Pennsylvania on January 1, 1946. Originally the area started as a farming community with additional activity in the mining of limestone. Limekiln Pike today continues to be an important travel artery.

American Revolutionary War

During the Philadelphia campaign of the American Revolutionary War, George Washington and the Continental Army were encamped here after their October 4, 1777 defeat at the Battle of Germantown, and immediately prior to their march to Valley Forge.  From December 5–8, 1777, the Battle of White Marsh was fought here between British and American forces.  Throughout the encampment, Washington was headquartered at the Emlen House, built by Quaker George Emlen in 1745.  British commander General William Howe observed the American lines from the belltower of St. Thomas' Episcopal Church (at Bethlehem Pike and Camp Hill Road), site of the British encampment on December 5.  Fort Washington State Park, in neighboring Whitemarsh Township, contains the area in which the primary American defenses were situated.

Geography
According to the U.S. Census Bureau, the Township has a total area of 13.2 square miles (34.2 km2), of which 13.2 square miles (34.2 km2)  is land and 0.04 square mile (0.1 km2)  (0.15%) is water. The township is situated in the Delaware watershed and almost all of it is drained by the Wissahickon Creek into the Schuylkill River, except for very small areas near the northeastern boundary drained by the Neshaminy Creek and the Pennypack Creek.

Demographics

As of the 2010 census, there were 25,569 people, 9,397 households, and 7,214 families residing in the township. The population density was 1,966 people per square mile (758.9/km2). The racial makeup of the township 83.0% White, 6.6% African American, 0.1% Native American, 8.5% Asian, 0.5% from other races, and 1.3% were two or more races. Hispanic or Latino of any race were 1.8% of the population.

There were 9,397 households, out of which 35.2% had children under the age of 18 living with them, 66.1% were married couples living together, 7.9% had a female householder with no husband present, and 23.2% were non-families. The average household size was 2.69 and the average family size was 3.13.

In the Township the population was spread out, with 27.3% under the age of 19, 3.9% from 20 to 24, 20.5% from 25 to 44, 33.2% from 45 to 64, and 15.1% who were 65 years of age or older.  The median age was 43.9 years. For every 100 females, there were 94.6 males.

As of the 2000 census, the median income for a household in the township was $80,093, and the median income for a family was $91,418 (these figures had risen to $106,337 and $123,030 respectively as of a 2007 estimate). Males had a median income of $68,353 versus $39,152 for females. The per capita income for the Township was $37,994.  About 2.7% of families and 3.0% of the population were below the poverty line, including 3.3% of those under age 18 and 3.6% of those age 65 or over.

The ten most common ancestries of residents are Irish (21.3%), German (19.0%), Italian (14.2%), English (10.2%), Russian (8.7%), Asian (6.2%), Polish (6.0%), African American (1.4%) United States or American (8.0%), and French (2.0%).

The most common languages spoken at home after English (88.6%) are Korean (3.1%), Italian (1.7%), Chinese (1.5%), Spanish or Spanish Creole (1.0%), German (0.7%), and French (0.6%).

Notable people

 Bill Apter – professional wrestling journalist
 Kim Gallagher – athlete, U.S. Olympic track team
 Geologist (musician) - pseudonym of Brian Weitz, member of indie band Animal Collective
 Suzy Kolber – anchor and reporter for ESPN
 Zach Pfeffer – former midfielder for the Philadelphia Union soccer team
 Josh Singer – Emmy-nominated writer and script supervisor for The West Wing, Lie to Me, and Fringe; winner of Academy Award for Best Original Screenplay for Spotlight (2016).
 John Tartaglia – Tony Award nominee for Avenue Q and star of Disney Channel's Johnny and the Sprites
 Tammi Terrell – singer
 Tom Warburton – animator, creator of the Cartoon Network series Codename: Kids Next Door
 Marc Zumoff – Philadelphia 76ers' television play-by-play commentator

Government 

Upper Dublin became a Pennsylvania First Class Township in 1946. Elected representatives (Commissioners) serve four-year terms of office. The government is a council/manager type. There are seven commissioners, one for each ward. The Commissioners from odd numbered wards stand for election in 2023, 2027, 2031 etc. and the even numbered wards in 2021, 2025, 2029 etc. A manager runs the day-to-day operations with his staff. There are eight departments: Administration, Finance, Library, Public Works, Police, Parks and Recreation, Code Enforcement, and Fleet & Facilities. Fire protection is provided primarily by the Fort Washington Fire Company No. 1, a volunteer fire department.

Business and industry 

The Fort Washington Office Park is a center of commerce in Upper Dublin Township.  When it opened in 1955, this was the first modern suburban business park on the East Coast.  Strategically located at a Pennsylvania Turnpike interchange, this 566-acre suburban office park contains more than 80 commercial buildings totaling over six million square feet, and is home to 230 businesses, employing more than 12,000 workers across a variety of industries.  The mix of uses has shifted from light industrial to office-based businesses over its 60+ year lifespan.

To remain competitive, Upper Dublin Township partnered with state and county government agencies to develop a multifaceted modernization plan including major infrastructure improvements, transportation planning and a proposed mixed-use zoning ordinance. With the proposed mixed-use zoning, the addition of new multifamily housing, retail and dining are anticipated. In September 2016, the Township formed a new Municipal Authority, to oversee the planning, design and financing of the Office Park's public improvement projects going forward.

The business community's response to this modernization program has been positive, with numerous new business openings including corporate headquarters, research labs and call centers.  Among the companies that recently moved in to Fort Washington Office Park are Aon Affinity Insurance, Kellogg Company, Citizens Bank, Life Time Athletics, Ashfield Healthcare, Impax Laboratories, Lincoln Investment Planning, TruMark Financial Federal Credit Union, TransWorld Systems, Connexin Software and Acclara Solutions.  They join long-term businesses in Fort Washington including Honeywell, Johnson & Johnson and NutriSystem's headquarters offices. Toll Brothers moved its corporate headquarters to the office park in 2020.

In 2017 Upper Dublin Township acquired a 56,000 s.f. office building in the Fort Washington Office Park, to house several municipal functions and supplement its community services. Later, it was announced that the Upper Dublin Public Library would be moving to this facility. The Upper Dublin Public Library opened in 2020.

Transportation

Numbered routes serving Upper Dublin Township include PA 63 (Welsh Road, which forms the northeast border), PA 152 (Limekiln Pike), I-276 (Pennsylvania Turnpike), and PA 309 (Fort Washington Expressway). I-276 and PA 309 meet at the Fort Washington Interchange. I-276 also has a westbound cashless tolling slip ramp in Upper Dublin Township connecting with Virginia Drive east of PA 309. Other important roads include Bethlehem Pike, Butler Pike, Morris Road, Norristown Road, and Susquehanna Road.

The Lansdale/Doylestown Line of SEPTA Regional Rail passes through Upper Dublin Township, but has no stops within the township. The nearest stops are the Fort Washington station in Whitemarsh Township, Oreland station in Springfield, and the Ambler station in Ambler. SEPTA provides bus service to Upper Dublin Township along Route 80, which runs a limited stop weekday route through the township between the Olney Transportation Center in North Philadelphia and the Horsham business parks; Route 94, which passes through the western part of the township near Fort Washington on its route between Chestnut Hill and the Montgomery Mall; Route 95, which passes through the western part of the township near Fort Washington on its route between Gulph Mills and Willow Grove; and Route 201, which provides weekday service between the Fort Washington business parks and the Fort Washington station.

Norfolk Southern Railway's Morrisville Line freight railroad line passes through Upper Dublin Township, running parallel to the south of the Pennsylvania Turnpike.

Education 

There are four elementary schools (K-5), one middle school (6-8) and one high school (9-12) which are fully accredited by the Middle States Association of Colleges and Schools. The professional staff has an average of 16 years teaching experience and approximately 85 percent hold advanced degrees.

The four elementary schools are Fort Washington Elementary School, Maple Glen Elementary School, Jarrettown Elementary School, and Thomas Fitzwater Elementary School; the middle school is Sandy Run Middle School, and the high school is Upper Dublin High School.  Upper Dublin High School is considered to be one of the best-performing public schools in Pennsylvania, with the fifth highest combined score average on the Scholastic Assessment Test (SAT) in the state.  The high school has been recognized three times by the United States Department of Education as a Blue Ribbon School of Excellence.

The Township is also home to a number of private schools. There is an area Catholic grade school, Our Lady of Mercy Regional Catholic School, in Maple Glen. Our Lady of Mercy was formed in 2012 by the merger of St. Alphonsus in Maple Glen, St. Anthony-St. Joseph in Ambler, and St. Catherine of Siena in Horsham.

The township has the following universities: Temple University Ambler and Fort Washington campuses, DeVry University Fort Washington campus and Gwynedd Mercy College Fort Washington campus.

Parks and recreation 
There are natural resource areas as well as active recreation sites with varying amenities including tennis courts, play lots, jogging/exercise trails, picnic pavilions, playing fields, basketball courts and sand volleyball courts. In 2005, the Township opened MonDaug Bark Park, with wooded trails as well as a  fenced, off-leash dog park.

In 2006, the Board of Commissioners adopted an extensive Open Space & Environmental Resources Protection Plan that guides local acquisition, development and protection efforts to the year 2020.

Upper Dublin is also home to two golf courses. Manufacturers Golf & Country Club is nestled on historic Camp Hill and is nationally known. Lu Lu Country Club is located in the southeastern section of the township bordering Abington.

References

External links

 Upper Dublin Township
 Upper Dublin School District
 Upper Dublin Business Directory

 
Townships in Montgomery County, Pennsylvania
Townships in Pennsylvania
1701 establishments in Pennsylvania